Step bells are a type of inclined metallophone, usually arranged in a C major scale, commonly used in music education. Arranged that the bars ascend in elevation along with their pitch, step bells are frequently used to explain musical directionality and intervals.

Bells (percussion)